The Inquirer and Mirror, also called The I&M, or "The Inky", is the weekly newspaper of record on the island of Nantucket, Massachusetts. It is published every Thursday morning and has been in continuous publication since 1821.

The Inquirer and Mirror, began as The Inquirer in June 1821 at the height of the island's prominence in the global whaling industry. In 1865 its ownership acquired another newspaper, The Mirror, and the masthead that we know today as The Inquirer and Mirror was born.  The Inquirer and Mirror has received many awards over the years and since 2000 has been named Newspaper of the Year multiple times by the New England Press Association (NEPA) and New England Newspaper and Press Association (NENPA)  The New England Newspaper Association (NENA) and Newspaper of the Year by Suburban Newspapers of America (SNA).
The Inquirer and Mirror also publishes the magazine Nantucket Today.
For most of its 200 year history The Inquirer and Mirror was independently owned. In 1990 it was sold by Tom and Marie Giffin to Ottaway Newspapers, a subsidiary of Dow Jones. In 2007 NewsCorp purchased Dow Jones and its assets, including Ottaway Newspapers. Dow Jones renamed Ottaway Newspapers Local Media Group. In 2013 Local Media Group, which included The Inquirer and Mirror,  was sold to GateHouse Newspapers which acquired Gannett in November 2019, retaining the name Gannett. On November 1, 2020, The Inquirer and Mirror returned to independent ownership when 41 North Media LLC purchased the newspaper and its assets from Gannett. Management of The Inquirer and Mirror remained in place.

The I&M Website, http://www.ack.net, takes its name from the IATA code of the island's only airport, ACK.

References

External links

Nantucket Today

Newspapers published in Massachusetts
Nantucket, Massachusetts
Publications established in 1821
Gannett publications